Ultimate Aaliyah is a posthumous box set and second posthumous album overall by American singer Aaliyah. It was released in selected countries on April 4, 2005 by Blackground Records. The box set consists of three discs–the first disc is a greatest hits collection, the second, entitled Are You Feelin' Me?, contains material from soundtracks and Timbaland's studio albums, while the third is a DVD with the documentary The Aaliyah Story.

Ultimate Aaliyah received generally favorable reviews from critics. Due to its limited release, it peaked at number 32 on the UK Albums Chart and sold only 75,000 copies worldwide. The song "Are You Feelin' Me?", previously included on the Romeo Must Die soundtrack (2000), was released as a single in the United Kingdom to promote the album but failed to chart. Following its global release on October 8, 2021, Ultimate Aaliyah debuted at number 41 on the US Billboard 200.

Release
Ultimate Aaliyah was released in France and the United Kingdom on April 4, 2005 and in Australia on May 2. Unlike Aaliyah's previous releases, Ultimate Aaliyah was released independently by Blackground Records, without the involvement of a major label. The album consists of three discs–two CDs and a DVD featuring the 60-minute documentary The Aaliyah Story compiled of promo clips, interviews, and special features, including MTV special, MTV News Now: The Life of Aaliyah, a Tribute to Aaliyah, Aaliyah's VH1 Behind the Music installment, and her E! True Hollywood Story episode. In Japan, a CD+DVD compilation album titled Special Edition: Rare Tracks & Visuals was released on March 14 instead of Ultimate Aaliyah.

In 2017, a company named Craze Productions leaked the album on streaming services for 18 hours, and within minutes, Ultimate Aaliyah skyrocketed to number four on the iTunes charts. Hours later, the album was taken down off sites by Aaliyah's uncle and manager Barry Hankerson, and a lawsuit to Craze Productions was filed. The same company earlier issued her previous compilation album I Care 4 U (2002) digitally, for which it was sued by Reservoir Media Management, the last company managing Blackground Records' catalog.

In August 2021, it was reported that the album (minus the DVD) and Aaliyah's other recorded work for Blackground (since rebranded as Blackground Records 2.0) would be re-released on physical, digital and, for the first time ever, streaming services, in a deal between the label and Empire Distribution. Ultimate Aaliyah was released on October 8; it also marked the first time the album was available globally, as the album had previously been released only in Australia, France and the United Kingdom. The re-release was met with disdain from Aaliyah's estate, who issued a statement denouncing the "unscrupulous endeavor to release Aaliyah's music without any transparency or full accounting to the estate".

Critical reception

Ultimate Aaliyah received generally favorable reviews from critics. Andy Kellman of AllMusic gave the album four and a half stars out of five, stating: "From the delightful "Back and Forth" through the all-too-sobering "Miss You," Ultimate Aaliyah adequately represents the shortened career of a tremendous talent who benefited from some of the best songwriting and production work by Timbaland, Missy Elliott, and R. Kelly. Casual fans will get most of the hits; collectors will be pleased to plug some gaps and get the documentary as a bonus." In the Encyclopedia of Popular Musics 5th Concise edition (2007), writer Colin Larkin gave the album three out of five stars.

Commercial performance
Ultimate Aaliyah debuted at number 32 on the UK Albums Chart and number 13 on the UK R&B Albums Chart, with 20,000 copies sold. In October 2011, it was awarded a gold certification from the Independent Music Companies Association (IMPALA), indicating sales in excess of 75,000 copies. 

Following its 2021 reissue, Ultimate Aaliyah reached a new peak at number eight on the UK R&B Albums Chart and debuted at number 41 on the US Billboard 200. Following the release of the vinyl version of the album in the UK, on 23 September 2022, the compilation charted at number three on the UK R&B Albums Chart (a new peak), and number 27 on the UK Vinyl Albums Chart Top 40.

Track listing

Notes
  signifies a remixer

Samples
"More Than a Woman" contains an uncredited sample from the Arabic song "Alouli Ansa" by Syrian singer Mayada El Hennawy (1993).
"I Care 4 U" heavily samples "(Too Little in Common to Be Lovers) Too Much Going to Say Goodbye" by The Newcomers (1974), written by Carl Hampton and Homer Banks.
"Don't Know What to Tell Ya" contains an uncredited sample from the Arabic song "Batwannis Beek" performed by Algerian singer Warda Al-Jazairia (1992).
"Come Back in One Piece" contains a sample of "Sir Nose D'Voidoffunk" by Parliament, from their 1977 LP Funkentelechy vs. the Placebo Syndrome.
"Hold On" contains a sample of "Breaking Glass" by Geri Halliwell (2001).

Personnel
Credits adapted from the liner notes of Ultimate Aaliyah.

Aaliyah – lead vocals
Carlton Batts – mastering
Teddy Bishop – producer
Hamish Brown – photography
Bud'da – producer
Jimmy Douglass – mixing, engineer
Missy Elliott – rap, backing vocals
Irv Gotti – producer
Bernie Grundman – mastering
Barry Hankerson – executive producer
Jomo Hankerson – executive producer
Michael Haughton – executive producer
Vincent Herbert – producer
Kevin Hicks – producer
Craig Kallman – executive producer
Craig King – producer
Lil Rob – producer
Grant Nelson – remixer
Rapture – producer
Eric Seats – producer
Donnie Scantz – producer
Senator Jimmy D – engineer
Daryl Simmons – producer
Timbaland – rap, backing vocals, producer, executive producer, mixing
Albert Watson – photography

Charts

Release history

Notes

References

External links
 

2005 compilation albums
Albums produced by R. Kelly
Albums produced by Timbaland
Compilation albums published posthumously
Aaliyah compilation albums